Environment International is a peer-reviewed scientific journal covering environmental science and health. It was established in 1978 and is published eight times per year by Elsevier. The co-editors-in-chief are Adrian Covaci (University of Antwerp),  Mark Nieuwenhuijsen, Zhen (Jason) He, and Yongguan Zhu. According to the Journal Citation Reports, the journal has a 2020 impact factor of 9.621.

References

External links

Environmental science journals
Elsevier academic journals
Publications established in 1978
English-language journals
Environmental health journals